LMS Perseverance was a Jubilee Class locomotive of the London, Midland and Scottish Railway. Constructed at Crewe in 1936 with the original number 5731, it was renumbered to 45731 on 18 December 1948. Between January 1948 and August 1961, the loco was allocated to Carlisle Kingmoor engine shed. Like many other Jubilees, it was named after a Royal Navy ship, HMS Perseverance, though the name existed on railway engines as far back as 1829: a locomotive named Perseverance ran in the 1829 Rainhill Trials.

45731 was withdrawn from service in October 1962 and cut up at Cowlairs in 1963.

Sources
 

5731 Perseverance
Standard gauge steam locomotives of Great Britain
Scrapped locomotives